Timothy Donnelly (born June 3, 1969, Providence, Rhode Island) is an American poet.

Life
He earned his BA from Johns Hopkins University and his MFA in Poetry from Columbia University's MFA in Creative Writing program. 
He is an associate professor at Columbia University. He became a poetry editor for the Boston Review in 1996.

Donnelly is the author of Twenty-Seven Props for a Production of Eine Lebenszeit (Grove Press, 2003), and The Cloud Corporation (Wave Books, 2010).

Awards and honors
2012: Kingsley Tufts Poetry Award, The Cloud Corporation
2012: Guggenheim Fellowship
2014: Alice Fay di Castagnola Award

Bibliography

Poetry collections

The Cloud Corporation (chapbook) (hand held editions, 2008)

 (coauthored with John Ashbery and Geoffrey G. O'Brien)
"Hymn to Life" (chapbook) (Factory Hollow Press, 2014)
"Poems for Political Disaster" (chapbook). Boston Review. January 2017. .

List of poems

References

External links
 Timothy Donnelly's author page at Wave Books
 Timothy Donnelly's faculty page at Columbia University
 Timothy Donnelly talks about getting "The Cloud Corporation" published in Harper's and "Globus Hystericus" in The Paris Review
 'The Syntactical Sublime', review of The Cloud Corporation in the Oxonian Review
 “A javelin of lavender…asserts a dozen verities”, review of The Cloud Corporation on THEthe Poetry Blog

Johns Hopkins University alumni
Living people
Columbia University School of the Arts alumni
The New Yorker people
1969 births
Columbia University faculty
21st-century American poets